is a 1963 Japanese drama film directed by Kirio Urayama. It was entered into the 3rd Moscow International Film Festival, where it won a Golden Prize.

Cast
 Masako Izumi as Wakae
 Mitsuo Hamada as Saburo
 Jun Hamamura
 Tanie Kitabayashi as Shizue Kita
 Toshiko Kobayashi
 Asao Koike as Taro Sawada
 Minako Kozuki
 Densuke Mitsuzawa
 Shoichi Ozawa
 Fukuko Sayo
 Toshio Takahara as Takeda

References

External links
 

1963 films
1963 drama films
Japanese drama films
1960s Japanese-language films
Films directed by Kirio Urayama
1960s Japanese films